Brendan Broderick is an American author and screenwriter. A graduate of the Tisch School of the Arts at New York University, his screenwriting credits include numerous B-movies and action films, many made with producer Roger Corman.  Titles include Route 9 (1998) with Kyle MacLachlan and Peter Coyote; Fear of Flying (1999); Spacejacked (1997); House of the Damned; Bloodfist VII: Manhunt (1995), and Bloodfist VI: Ground Zero (1995), both starring Don "The Dragon" Wilson; A Bucket of Blood (1995) with Anthony Michael Hall, Justine Bateman and Will Ferrell; and Stranglehold (1994).

His first novel, Play It Straight, was published by Epigram Press in 2012.

References

External links

American male screenwriters
1965 births
Living people
Tisch School of the Arts alumni